Patakaniaya is a Village in Ghazipur District of Uttar Pradesh, India

References 

Villages in Ghazipur district